National Association of Clean Water Agencies (NACWA) represents the interests of publicly owned wastewater treatment facilities, collection systems, and stormwater management agencies before the United States Congress, several Federal agencies, and in the courts. National Association of Clean Water Agencies advocates for federal funding for clean water agencies and for responsible national policies that advance clean water and a healthy environment.

History
National Association of Clean Water Agencies' inception and evolution tracks closely with that of the Clean Water Act and establishment of the U.S. Environmental Protection Agency. In the late 1960s and early 1970s, Sen. Edmund Muskie (D-Maine), chair of the Environmental Subcommittee of the Senate Committee on Public Works, spearheaded environmental legislation to clean up the rivers, lakes, and streams in the United States.  He has been described as "one of the first environmentalists to enter the Senate, and was a leading campaigner for new and stronger measures to curb pollution and provide a cleaner environment".

As these changes were occurring, a group of individuals representing 22 of the largest municipal wastewater treatment plants came together over concerns about federal funding to implement the legislation at the local level.  In 1970, these agencies established a coalition they called the Association of Metropolitan Sewerage Agencies (AMSA) to ensure federal funding for municipal water projects.  Then in 1972, the historic Clean Water Act (full name, Federal Water Pollution Control Amendments of 1972) was passed.

When Association of Metropolitan Sewerage Agencies, now National Association of Clean Water Agencies, members learned that President Nixon was planning to veto the bill, the Association sent him a telegram urging him to sign it.  Although the President did veto the bill, Congress overrode the veto and the Clean Water Act was enacted.  The legislation created programs to help municipalities clean up local waters. Shortly after passage, the U.S. Environmental Protection Agency (EPA) was created. From that point on, Environmental Protection Agency and National Association of Clean Water Agencies worked together to clean up water pollution in the Nation’s cities. By that time, National Association of Clean Water Agencies "had become an organization consulted by members of the federal government concerned with water pollution".

National Association of Clean Water Agencies worked closely with Congress on the 1977 Clean Water Act Amendment, securing $26 billion for municipal clean water construction grants. "These were local government people, and they were truly doing the basic job of cleaning up the rivers and lakes in their jurisdiction. Their primary impetus resulted from the obligations of local governments to protect the health of their citizens".

National Association of Clean Water Agencies has participated actively in over four decades of federal legislative and regulatory activity related to clean water.  National Association of Clean Water Agencies is now involved in environmental laws and regulations covering a variety of ecosystem issues including watershed management, nonpoint source pollution control, and the protection of air quality. National Association of Clean Water Agencies works closely with members of Congress, Presidential administrations, and EPA.

In 2005, Association of Metropolitan Sewerage Agencies changed its name to the National Association of Clean Water Agencies.  Core values were expanded to include ensuring scientifically and economically informed environmental policy and environmental stewardship.

Notable Campaigns
National Association of Clean Water Agencies represents clean water agencies in Congress, to the Environmental Protection Agency, and in the courts, advocating for increased funding, developing enforceable controls on nonpoint sources, working to improve the total maximum daily load (TMDL) program, addressing stormwater, and other issues.

In addition, National Association of Clean Water Agencies provides technical information and advocacy-focused publications on clean water issues. In addition to various publications including newsletters, white papers, and reports, National Association of Clean Water Agencies hosts five major conferences on various technical, policy, and utility management issues across the United States and sponsors web seminars on key issues.

References

External links
 

Water supply and sanitation in the United States